Monasterevin (Mainistir Eimhín in Irish) (also Monasterevan) railway station is on the Dublin to Cork InterCity railway line.
It is served mostly by commuter services to and from Heuston Station, Dublin. Until December 2017, there were no services on Sundays.

It is situated just outside the town of Monasterevin, County Kildare.

See also
 List of railway stations in Ireland

References

External links

Irish Rail Monasterevin Station website

Iarnród Éireann stations in County Kildare
Railway stations opened in 1847
Railway stations closed in 1976
Railway stations opened in 2001
Railway stations in the Republic of Ireland opened in 1847